The Longdendale Chain is a sequence of six reservoirs on the River Etherow in the Longdendale Valley, in northern Derbyshire. They were constructed between 1848 and 1884 to a design by John Frederick Bateman to supply the growing population of Manchester and Salford with fresh water.

The top three reservoirs (Woodhead, Torside and Rhodeswood) and Arnfield are for drinking water, and the lower reservoirs (Valehouse and Bottoms) are used as compensation reservoirs to maintain the downstream flow of the river. There was originally a seventh – Hollingworth Reservoir – which was abandoned in 1990, and has become part of the Swallows Wood nature reserve.

Water flowed by gravity through the Mottram Tunnel to the Godley covered reservoir where it drops to the service reservoirs at Denton, Audenshaw, Gorton and Prestwich.

Reservoirs 
The reservoirs are listed from upstream to downstream i.e. from east to west:
 Woodhead Reservoir
 Torside Reservoir
 Rhodeswood Reservoir
 Valehouse Reservoir
 Bottoms Reservoir
 Arnfield Reservoir

See also
List of dams and reservoirs in United Kingdom

References

Notes

Bibliography

 - popularising lecture, with copious plans & elevations (of Longendale chain as well as Thirlmere scheme)

 

Reservoirs of the Peak District
Reservoirs in Greater Manchester
Works by John Frederick Bateman